Boya is a locality on the Darling Scarp, in the Shire of Mundaring, Western Australia; it is on the south side of Greenmount Hill, and just west of Darlington.

The name of Boya is a local Noongar word meaning "stone" or "rock", and was imposed by government officials in the early twentieth century.

Quarries
It was crucial as a site of quarries. The Mountain Quarry and the Government Quarry were both important blue stone quarries in their time.

The harbour and moles at Fremantle were built using stone from the Government quarry.

The Government Quarry (on the south eastern part of the locality) was variously named during its time of operation as Mr O'Connor's quarry, the Fremantle Harbour Works Darlington Quarry, the Public Works Quarry,  the Government Quarry, and, currently, as Hudman Road Quarry.

Being at the edge of the Greenmount National Park and the Hudman Road Quarry, Boya has been subject to serious threatening bushfires spreading from these locations in recent years.

Railway 
In the history of the early Eastern Railway, which passed through Boya, Boya was the location of "Cape Horn", a notorious curve at the  mark, where runaway trains derailed a number of times.

The community has a rich architectural variety of houses due to the challenge of steep and rocky blocks.

Notes

References
 Elliot, Ian Mundaring – A History of the Shire. 1983 
 Spillman, Ken Life was meant to be here: community and local government in the Shire of Mundaring. 2003 
 Watson, Lindsay The railway history of Midland Junction. 1995

External links
Mundaring and Hills Historical Society website

Suburbs and localities in the Shire of Mundaring
Suburbs of Perth, Western Australia